Madison East High School is one of four comprehensive four-year high schools in Madison, Wisconsin. It was established in 1922, making it the oldest public high school still operating in Madison. The school mascot is "Peppy Purgolder", an animal resembling a feline. Madison East athletes compete in the WIAA Big Eight Conference. Its girls' swim team won the WIAA Division 1 state championship in 2007.

Facility 
Madison East was built by architect Frank Riley in 1922, in the Collegiate Gothic style. Since it was first built, four additions to the school have been constructed, in 1925, 1932, 1938-1939 and 1962–1963. Madison East has an inside mall, which was built from bricks from the older building before the school was expanded. This area houses most of the lockers in the school and serves as a place for students to congregate. The forum is normally reserved for freshman, but upperclassmen are also allowed to use it. Above the freshman forum is the "Sophomore Wall"; closer to the cafeteria are the "Junior" and "Senior" walls. In 2017, the Madison East theater underwent a major renovation, costing $4.7 million and radically changing the school's main performing arts space.

Academics 
Honors and advanced classes are part of the curriculum. Advanced Placement (AP) courses include Calculus AB, Calculus BC, Environmental Science, Statistics, French Language and Culture, Spanish Language and Culture, Music Theory, Psychology, Macroeconomics, Microeconomics, European History, Computer Science Principles, and Computer Science A. Courses are available in advanced physics, advanced chemistry, anatomy, literature, composition, creative writing, and computer programming.

The school also has a music program. The band program includes Freshman Band, Concert Band, Pep Band, Jazz Band, Jazz Orchestra and the highest level, Sinfonietta. The orchestra program includes the Concert Orchestra, the Symphony Orchestra and the Philharmonic Orchestra. The choir program has both concert choirs and show choirs. The concert choirs include Chorale, Women's Choir and Concert Choir. The Show Choirs include Mad City Swing and Encore Show Choir.

Extracurricular activities

Athletics 

East's sports include softball, volleyball, football, baseball, track and field, soccer, tennis, golf, gymnastics, wrestling, cross country, cheerleading, basketball, ice hockey and swimming. The hockey team won several state championships, however, because of a lack of funding and participation the hockey team has been combined with the team from La Follette.

The girls' swim team won the WIAA Division 1 state title in 2007, and was runner-up in 2008.

The boys' tennis team competed in the state tournament in the 2006, 2007, 2008, 2009 and 2011 seasons.

The girls' tennis team competed in the state tournament in the 1995, 2001, 2002, 2004, 2005, 2006, 2007, 2008, and 2011 seasons.

The boys' basketball team won three consecutive regional titles (2009, 2010, 2011) and were ranked 10th in the Midwest by USA Today in 2010. The team reached the state tournament in the 2014–15 season, falling to three-time defending champion Germantown in the semifinals. The Purgolders won their only state title in 1958.

The East Debate team has won many tournaments and qualified to State many times. Even getting to semifinals and winning elimination rounds at some tournaments. Revitalized by the mentor Miranda in 2014, the team has been getting exponentially better every year, and gunning to win state. However, the club is currently underfunded by the school.

The ultimate frisbee team took third place at the state meet in 2016 and second in 2017 season.

Theater 
The Margaret Williams Theater in East High School once had an upper balcony, a back section under the balcony, and an enormous chandelier. However, in the 1970s, the theater was renovated and the upper balcony was walled up to allow for the creation of the Barrett and Randall rooms as study halls. The chandelier was removed and the theater's seats were replaced with desks for more study halls. The theater was renovated in 2017. This renovation included the construction of a new balcony, and made the theater fully handicap-accessible.

Madison East High has a student theater program called the Eastside Players.

Notable alumni 

 Melissa Agard (Class of '87), Wisconsin State Legislator
 Andrea Arlington, model, television personality, life coach, and minister
 Connie Carpenter-Phinney (class of '75), professional cycle racer/speed skater and 1984 Summer Olympics Gold Medalist
 Michael Cole (actor), (class of '58), actor best known for his work on the television series The Mod Squad
 Dale Hackbart (class of '56), NFL linebacker/safety, Green Bay Packers (1960), Washington Redskins (1961-1963), Minnesota Vikings (1966-1970), St. Louis Cardinals (1971-1972), Denver Broncos (1973)
 Donald Hayes, (class of '94) NFL wide receiver, Carolina Panthers (1998-2001, 2004), New England Patriots (2002-2003)
 Gabe Jennings, (class of '97) middle-distance runner who competed in the 1,500 meters at the 2000 Sydney Olympics
 Jerry Kelly (class of '85), professional golfer, Nike Tour (1995), PGA Tour (1996-current)
 Konrad Bates Krauskopf (1910–2003), geologist
 Joe Kurth, NFL tackle, Green Bay Packers (1933-1934)
 Greg Mattison, NFL and NCAA football coach
 Jim Montgomery (class of '73), swimmer and gold medalist at the 1976 Summer Olympics
 Kathryn Morrison, legislator
 Pat Richter (class of '59), NFL tight end, Washington Redskins (1963-1970), University of Wisconsin–Madison Athletic Director (1989-2004)
 Kelda Roys, Wisconsin State Legislator
 Ken Starch, NFL running back, Green Bay Packers (1976)
 Bob Suter, (class of '75) 1980 "Miracle on Ice" Hockey Team Olympic Gold Medalist, professional hockey player
 Gary Suter, (class of '82) 2002  Hockey Team Olympic Silver Medalist, professional hockey player
 Bradley Whitford (class of '77), actor, most well known for his work on the television series The West Wing

References

External links

 Madison Metropolitan School District
 Madison East High School

High schools in Madison, Wisconsin
Educational institutions established in 1922
Public high schools in Wisconsin
1922 establishments in Wisconsin